is a Japanese manga series written and illustrated by Yuki Kawaguchi. It was serialized in publisher Shueisha's Weekly Shōnen Jump magazine from June to November 2021.

Premise
The series focuses on the young boy  who is invited by a woman named  to join a guild that specializes in hunting monsters.

Publication
The Hunters Guild: Red Hood, written and illustrated by Yuki Kawaguchi, was serialized in Shueisha's shōnen manga magazine Weekly Shōnen Jump from June 28 to November 8, 2021. Shueisha has collected its chapters into individual tankōbon volumes. The first volume was released on November 4, 2021, followed by volume two on January 4, 2022, and volume three on March 4, 2022.

The series has been licensed for simultaneous publication in North America as it is released in Japan, with its chapters being digitally launched in English by Shueisha on its Manga Plus service, as well as by Viz Media on its service. Viz Media will release the series in physical volumes in Fall 2022.

Volume list

Notes

References

External links
  
 
 The Hunters Guild: Red Hood on Manga Plus
 

2021 manga
Fantasy anime and manga
Horror anime and manga
Shōnen manga
Shueisha manga
Viz Media manga